The Egvoyager Voyager 203 is an Italian ultralight aircraft, designed and produced by Egvoyager and introduced in May 2011. The aircraft is supplied as a kit for amateur construction or as a complete ready-to-fly aircraft.

Design and development
The aircraft was designed to comply with the Fédération Aéronautique Internationale microlight rules. It features a cantilever low wing, a two-seats-in-side-by-side configuration enclosed cockpit under a bubble canopy with gull-winged doors, fixed, or optionally retractable, tricycle landing gear and a single engine in tractor configuration.

The aircraft is made from composites. Its  span wing employs flaps. The standard engine available is a  Rotax 912ULS four-stroke powerplant. The basic model is the Voyager Fly, with the Voyager Club and the Voyager Style being models with options included as standard equipment.

A light-sport aircraft category version is planned for the United States market.

Variants
Voyager 203 CF
Fixed landing gear model
Voyager 203 CR
Retractable landing gear model, at an additional cost of €7000.

Specifications (Voyager 203)

References

External links

2010s Italian ultralight aircraft
Homebuilt aircraft
Single-engined tractor aircraft